Choices Markets is a grocer based in British Columbia, Canada, that is focused on natural, specialty and organic food.

Overview 
The chain has ten stores: eight in Metro Vancouver, one in the Fraser Valley and one location in Kelowna. Choices Markets opened its 10th location, North Vancouver, in the second quarter of 2016. Choices was founded in December 1990 by brothers Wayne and Lloyd Lockhart. The original store is located in Kitsilano on West 16th avenue. The owners emphasize that the store caters to a range of diets, including gluten free, vegetarian and vegan. Lockhart cites this is a guiding principle for the chain: "It's all about providing choice."

The company has relied on various techniques aimed at increasing customer loyalty in order to compete with larger chains in the area, such as providing customers with the Choices preferred shopper card, which allows customers to receive discounts on specially labelled products and accumulate points when they shop, providing an in-house nutritionist to help advise customers and worked to build energy and "theatre" in stores through product demos, food festivals and farmer/shopper interaction.

The Canadian Federation of Independent Grocers inducted Choices Markets White Rock (in South Surrey, British Columbia) into their Hall of Fame in 2015. To be eligible for Hall of Fame induction, a store must win at least three Gold Awards or receive one Platinum Achievement Award and one Gold Award.

Choices Markets was sold to the Buy-Low Foods Group on December 3, 2017. The previous Choices ownership decided to retire and selected an owner they believed would retain what the Choices brand stands for while remaining locally owned and operated.

Choices Markets was selected as the Fairtrade Canada Retailer of the Year in February 2018. They have won this award 5 of the past 6 years.

See also
List of Canadian supermarkets

Notes

References

External links
Choices website
Choices Facebook
Choices Twitter
Choices Instagram

Companies based in British Columbia
Delta, British Columbia
Organic food retail organizations
Supermarkets of Canada
Retail companies established in 1990
Food and drink companies based in British Columbia